Akwidaa is a small town and fishing village in Ahanta West district, a district in the Western Region of south-west Ghana, and is one of the southernmost places in Ghana.

Economy 
The economy is primarily based upon fishing, with many fishing boats lining the beach.

The town and fishing village has Ezile bay village and the Green Turtle Lodge with eight thatched solar powered huts facing the beach alongside a bar and dining annex. It is named after the many green turtles that lay their eggs on Akwidaa beach.

Most business is conducted in the village without legal paperwork and many of the surrounding village chiefs own the land and the coconut trees and all purchases must be transacted through them. Business deals are based on trust and spoken words. A new landowner can buy a tree from the village chiefs and has the options of felling it, or keeping the trees standing and harvesting the coconuts on a farm.

The recent oil discovery in Ghana also has made Akwidaa a new place for investment due to its oil reserved (Block) near Cape Three Point.

History 
Akwidaa is a Twi word meaning old man, who during Dutch colonial times, used to ferry people across the river.

In the late 17th and early 18th Century (April 1684 – 1687, 1698–1711, April 1712 – 1717) Akwidaa, then known as Fort Dorothea, was the smaller of two forts which constituted a German colony, the Brandenburger Gold Coast. It was the focus of a struggle with the Dutch, who occupied it in 1687–1698 and to whom the Brandenburgers finally sold it. The ruins of Fort Dorothea were inscribed on the UNESCO World Heritage List in 1979 along with several other forts and castles in Ghana because of its testimony to European colonial influence and exploitation in West Africa.

References

External links 

Populated places in Ahanta West Municipal District
Fishing communities
Fishing communities in Ghana